Breaking Away 
is a 1979 American coming of age comedy-drama film produced and directed by Peter Yates and written by Steve Tesich. It follows a group of four male teenagers in Bloomington, Indiana, who have recently graduated from high school. The film stars Dennis Christopher, Dennis Quaid, Daniel Stern (in his film debut), Jackie Earle Haley, Barbara Barrie, Paul Dooley, and Robyn Douglass.

Breaking Away won the 1979 Academy Award for Best Original Screenplay for Tesich, and received nominations in four other categories, including Best Picture. It also won the 1979 Golden Globe Award for Best Film (Comedy or Musical) and received nominations in three other Golden Globe categories.

As the film's young lead, Christopher won the 1979 BAFTA Award for Most Promising Newcomer and the 1979 Young Artist Award for Best Juvenile Actor, as well as getting a Golden Globe nomination as New Star of the Year.

The film was ranked eighth on the List of America's 100 Most Inspiring Movies compiled by the American Film Institute (AFI) in 2006. In June 2008, AFI also announced its 10 Top 10—the best ten films in ten classic American film genres—after polling over 1,500 people from the creative community. In that poll Breaking Away ranked as the eighth best film in the sports genre.

Tesich was an alumnus of Indiana University Bloomington. The film was shot in and around Bloomington and on the university's campus.

Plot
Dave, Mike, Cyril, and Moocher are working-class friends living in the college town of Bloomington, Indiana. Now turning 19, they all graduated from high school the year before and are not sure what to do with their lives. They spend much of their time together swimming in an old, abandoned water-filled quarry. They sometimes clash with the more affluent Indiana University students in their hometown, who habitually refer to them as "cutters", a derogatory term for locals related to the local Indiana limestone industry and the stonecutters who worked the quarries. (The term "cutters" was invented for the movie, because the real name "stonies” was deemed unusable because of its perceived link to marijuana.)

Dave is obsessed with competitive bicycle racing, and Italian racers in particular, because he recently won a Masi bicycle. His down-to-earth father Ray, a former stonecutter who now operates his own used car business (sometimes unethically), is puzzled and exasperated by his son's love of Italian music and culture, which Dave associates with cycling. However, his mother Evelyn is more understanding and prepares Italian dishes for him.

Dave develops a crush on a university student named Katherine and masquerades as an Italian exchange student in order to romance her. One evening, he serenades "Caterina" outside her sorority house by singing Friedrich von Flotow's aria "M' Apparì Tutt' Amor", with Cyril providing guitar accompaniment. When her boyfriend Rod finds out, he and some of his fraternity brothers beat Cyril up, mistaking him for Dave. Though Cyril wants no trouble, Mike insists on tracking down Rod and starting a brawl. The university president (real-life then President Dr. John W. Ryan) reprimands the students for their arrogance toward the "cutters" and, over their objections, invites the latter to participate in the annual Indiana University Little 500 race.

When a professional Italian cycling team comes to town for a race, Dave is thrilled to be competing with them. However, the Italians become irked when Dave is able to keep up with them. One of them jams a tire pump in Dave's wheel, causing him to crash, which leaves him disillusioned. He subsequently confesses his deception to Katherine, who is heartbroken.

Dave's friends persuade him to join them in forming a cycling team for the Little 500. Ray privately tells his son how, when he was a young stonecutter, he was proud to help provide the material to construct the university, yet he never felt comfortable on campus. Later, Dave runs into Katherine, who is leaving for a job in Chicago; they patch things up.

Dave is so much better than the other competitors in the Little 500 that, while the other teams switch cyclists every few laps, he rides without a break and builds up a 3/4 lap lead. However, he injures his leg in a crash. Bleeding and in pain, he comes in for a rider change. After some hesitation, Mike, Cyril, and Moocher take turns pedaling, but their dithering has cost them the lead. They fall further and further back. Finally, Dave has them tape his feet to the pedals and starts to make up lost ground; he overtakes Rod, the current rider for the favored fraternity team, on the last lap and wins.

Ray is proud of his son and takes to riding a bicycle himself. Dave later enrolls at the university, where he meets a pretty French student. Soon, he is extolling to her the virtues of the Tour de France and French cyclists.

Cast

 Dennis Christopher as Dave Stohler
 Dennis Quaid as Mike
 Daniel Stern as Cyril
 Jackie Earle Haley as Moocher
 Paul Dooley as Ray Stohler
 Barbara Barrie as Evelyn Stohler
 Robyn Douglass as Katherine
 Hart Bochner as Rod
 P. J. Soles as Suzy
 Amy Wright as Nancy
 John Ashton as Mike's brother

Production

Inspiration
The Little 500 bicycle race that forms the centerpiece of the plot is a real race held annually at Indiana University. A reenactment of the race was staged for the film in the "old" Memorial Stadium on the IU campus, which was demolished in 1982, four years after Breaking Away was shot.

The team is based on the 1962 Phi Kappa Psi Little 500 champions, which featured legendary rider and Italian enthusiast Dave Blase, who provided screenwriter and fellow Phi Kappa Psi team member Steve Tesich the inspiration for the main character in the movie. Blase, together with team manager Bob Stohler, provided the name of this character: Dave Stohler. In the 1962 race, Blase rode 139 out of 200 laps and was the victory rider crossing the finish line, much like the main character in the film. Blase appears in the movie as the race announcer.

Filming

The scenes filmed in and around Bloomington, Indiana, were filmed during the summer of 1978. Prior to filming, cyclists Ira Schaffer and Gerry Bretting helped introduce Dennis Christopher and Hart Bochner to the world of bicycle racing after director Peter Yates met Gerry Bretting at Wilshire West Bicycle store. Schaffer and Bretting spent several weeks with Christopher and Bochner. Many of the scenes in the movie were filmed on the campus of Indiana University; glimpses of the Indiana Memorial Union are in the background of Dave's ride through campus. Dave Stohler's house in the film is located at the corner of S. Lincoln St. and E. Dodds St. The pizza restaurant in the film (PAGLIAI'S) is now Opie Taylors on the east side of North Walnut Street, across from the Monroe County Courthouse. Other scenes were filmed outside the Delta Delta Delta sorority house (818 E. 3rd St) and along Jordan Street.

Two other scenes were filmed on W. 7th St.: one at Fairview Elementary, the other three blocks east near the intersection of W. 7th St. and N. Madison (the old railroad tracks have since been removed). A scene in which Dave runs a red light in front of his father was filmed at the southwest corner of the Monroe County Courthouse, at the intersection of College St. and W. Kirkwood Ave. (a few seconds before he runs it, the light is visible as he rides by the courthouse and sees Moocher and Nancy). The starting-line scene of the Cinzano 100 bicycle race was at the intersection of Indiana State Roads 46 and 446 on the city's eastern edge.

The abandoned limestone quarry where Dave and his friends swam is on private property in Perry Township south of Bloomington. It is located at the end of East Empire Mill Road off old State Road 37 and is illegal for visitors to trespass. Rooftop Quarry, as it is referred to locally, was originally known as Sanders Quarry or The Long Hole. Access to the quarry has been made difficult by its owners Indiana Limestone Company, to discourage people from swimming and jumping into the quarry, citing safety concerns.

The used car lot ("Campus Cars") that Dave's father owns was on S. Walnut St., and was a real used car lot for many years, but now has two small commercial buildings on the property; it is located at 1010 S. Walnut St.  Next door is the local Honda motorcycle franchise seen in the background of the "Refund? REFUND??" scene; the Honda franchise was demolished in early 2019.

The film features music by Felix Mendelssohn, Gioachino Rossini and Friedrich von Flotow. The music was adapted by Patrick Williams.

Tesich and Yates worked together again on Eyewitness (1981) and Eleni (1985). Tesich later wrote the cycling-themed film American Flyers (1985).

Reception
The film received positive reviews upon its release. Roger Ebert called it "a wonderfully sunny, funny, goofy, intelligent movie that makes you feel about as good as any movie in a long time. It is, in fact, a treasure ... Movies like this are hardly ever made at all; when they're made this well, they're precious cinematic miracles." The New York Timess Janet Maslin wrote that, even though "the cast is unknown, the director has a spotty history, and the basic premise falls into this year's most hackneyed category ... the finished product is wonderful. Here is a movie so fresh and funny it didn't even need a big budget or a pedigree." A Variety magazine review concluded that "though its plot wins no points for originality, Breaking Away is a thoroughly delightful light comedy, lifted by fine performances from Dennis Christopher and Paul Dooley." Critic Dave Kehr, however, gave a later, somewhat dissenting opinion: "Released at a time when any small-scale film earned critical favor simply by virtue of its unpretentiousness, Breaking Away probably looked better in context than it does now." However, he conceded that "Peter Yates lends the film a fine, unexpected limpidity, and the principals are mostly excellent." 

On review aggregator website Rotten Tomatoes, the film has an approval rating of 95% based on 41 reviews, with a rating average of 8.2/10. The website's critical consensus reads: "At once a touching, funny coming-of-age story and a compelling sports film, Breaking Away is a delightful treat." On Metacritic — which assigns a weighted mean score — the film has a score of 91 out of 100 based on 15 critics, indicating "universal acclaim".

The film grossed approximately $20 million in North America.

The New York Times placed the film on its Best 1000 Movies Ever list.

NBC paid $5 million to screen the film on television on May 5, 1980 bypassing HBO and significantly shortening the normal window between theatrical release and screening on broadcast television, which was generally three years at the time.

Accolades

Legacy
A short-lived television series based on the film, also titled Breaking Away, aired in 1980–1981 and starred Shaun Cassidy.  Barrie, Haley and Ashton reprised their roles in the prequel series.

The film inspired the song "One For the Cutters" by The Hold Steady, which appeared on their 2008 album Stay Positive.

The 1992 Bollywood film Jo Jeeta Wohi Sikandar, starring Aamir Khan, has certain similarities to Breaking Away. However, the director Mansoor Khan stated that he only became aware of Breaking Away after the likeness was brought to his attention. Both films have several thematic similarities, including friendship, class barriers, bicycle racing, and parental relationship, but are distinctly different films, with different narratives, characters, motivations, treatment and racing rules.

References

External links

 
 
 Original screenplay by Steve Tesich with the title Bambino, June 9, 1978. thescriptlab.com.
 
 
 
 
 Google Maps view of the limestone quarry

1979 films
1970s coming-of-age comedy-drama films
1970s sports comedy-drama films
20th Century Fox films
American coming-of-age comedy-drama films
American sports comedy-drama films
Best Musical or Comedy Picture Golden Globe winners
Cycling films
1970s English-language films
Films about social class
Films adapted into television shows
Films directed by Peter Yates
Films scored by Patrick Williams
Films set in Indiana
Films shot in Indiana
Films whose writer won the Best Original Screenplay Academy Award
Films about fraternities and sororities
National Society of Film Critics Award for Best Film winners
1970s American films